"Karaoke Plays" is a song by Newcastle-upon-Tyne band Maxïmo Park. It is  the fourth single released from their second studio album, Our Earthly Pleasures. The single was released on 3 December 2007.

The music video for "Karaoke Plays" was directed by Amy Neil.

Track listings

Enhanced CD
 "Karaoke Plays" (Radio Edit) – 3:50
 "George Brown" – 3:13
 "Like I Love You" – 3:37
 Exclusive Enhanced Content: 
 "Karaoke Plays" video
 Animated lyric booklet
 "Our Velocity" ringtone

7" vinyl #1 (Numbered white vinyl with free poster)
 "Karaoke Plays" – 4:08
 "Jean Baudrillard"

7" vinyl #2 (Numbered silver vinyl with free poster)
 "Karaoke Plays" (Live at 1LIVE) – 4:20
 "Jonathan Cole"

Digital Exclusive 1 (Recordstore Bundle Only)
 "Karaoke Plays" (Acoustic Version)  – 4:28

Digital Exclusive 2 (Recordstore Bundle Bonus Track)
 "Karaoke Plays" (Live at 1LIVE) – 4:20

References

External links
 Official track listings

2007 singles
Maxïmo Park songs
Songs written by Paul Smith (rock vocalist)
Songs written by Duncan Lloyd
2007 songs
Song recordings produced by Gil Norton
Warp (record label) singles